Strepsodiscus is an extinct genus of very primitive fossil snail-like molluscs from the early part of the Late Cambrian (Dresbachian Age) of North America. The coiled, slightly asymmetrical shells are about 3 cm in height. It is not known whether these are shells of gastropods (sea snails) or monoplacophorans, which are more primitive mollusks.

Bouchet & Rocroi (2005) divide the Bellerophontoidea  into 8 families listed Paleozoic molluscs with isostrophically coiled shells of uncertain position within Mollusca (Gastropoda or Monoplacophora)

Knight, et al., 1960 included this genus within the Cyrtolitidae, a paraphyletic or polyphyletic assemblage of proto-gastropods and Tergomyan molluscs.  Strepsodiscus may be too primitive to be a true gastropod.

Species
Species within the genus Strepsodiscus are as follows: 

 Strepsodiscus major 
 S. minutissimus
 S. paucivoluta
 S. splettstoesseri
 S. strongi

References

 Knight, J. B., Cox, L. R., Keen, A. M., Batten, R. L., Yochelson, E. L., and Robertson, R. (1960). Systematic descriptions (Archaeogastropoda). In Moore, R. C. (ed.) Treatise on Invertebrate Paleontology. Part I. Mollusca 1, pp. 169–310. Geological Society of America and Kansas University Press, Colorado and Kansas. 
 Wagner, P. J. (1999). Phylogenetics of the earliest anisostrophically coiled gastropods. Smithsonian Contributions to Paleobiology 88: 1 - 132.

External links
Strepsodiscus - Palaeos
 A possible reference: 
 Info at Paleobiology Database: 

Cambrian molluscs
Cambrian animals of North America
Paleozoic life of Quebec

Cambrian genus extinctions